Göcek may refer to the following places:

 Göcek, Fethiye, a small town in the district of Fethiye, Muğla Province, Turkey
 Göcek, Akhisar, a village in the district of Akhisar, Manisa Province, Turkey
 Köcəkli, a village and municipality of Masally Rayon, Azerbaijan

See also
Göçek, a surname